Paul Fedor is a former university all-star and Canadian Football League defensive end.

Graduating from Queen's University, where he was an all-star in 1957, Fedor played for the Toronto Argonauts for 3 seasons, his best being 1960, when he caught 9 passes for 154 yards and 1 touchdown. In 1961 was traded to the Montreal Alouettes, along with Bobby Jack Oliver and linebacker Ron Brewer, for defensive end Doug McNichol and tackle Billy Shipp. He played two seasons with the Als.

References

Players of Canadian football from Ontario
Queen's University at Kingston alumni
Sportspeople from Niagara Falls, Ontario
Toronto Argonauts players
Montreal Alouettes players
Queen's Golden Gaels football players